Bartko is a surname. Notable people with the surname include:

Jim Bartko (1965–2020), American college athletics administrator
Ondrej Bartko (born 1915), Slovak Lutheran pastor, theologian, publicist and film screenplay writer
Robert Bartko (born 1975), German road bicycle and track cyclist
Šimon Bartko (born 1996), Slovak biathlete